An enterostomal therapist is a health professional trained in the care of persons with stomas, such as colostomies or urostomies.
An enterostomal therapy nurse, or ET nurse, is specialized in treating patients who have ostomies, wounds, or incontinence.

External links 
 Enterostomal therapist entry in the public domain NCI Dictionary of Cancer Terms

Health care occupations